Abubakar Moro (born 17 August 1991) is a Ghanaian professional footballer who plays for FK Donji Srem in the Serbian SuperLiga

Career
Moro Abubakar has played for several Ghanaian teams and has been playing as a midfielder at Hearts of Oak in the Ghana Premier League where he made 84 appearances and scored 1 goal between 2010 and 2013, although he played with Hearts of Oak between 2009 and 2014.  Moro became part of the 2011–12 Ghanaian Premier League team of the season.

On September 12, 2014, he arrived to Serbia and signed a 3-year contract with Serbian SuperLiga side FK Donji Srem and was attributed a shirt number 50 (shortly afterwards changed to number 5).  He made his debut in the SuperLiga as a starter in the round 6 match against FK Čukarički i a 1–1 draw.

International career
In November 2013, coach Maxwell Konadu invited him to be a part of the Ghana squad for the 2013 WAFU Nations Cup. He helped the team to a first-place finish after Ghana beat Senegal by three goals to one.

He has one appearance for main Ghana national team in the friendly match played against Libya on August 30, 2013.

Honours
Ghana Premier League: 2011–12 team of the season

References

Living people
1991 births
Footballers from Accra
Ghanaian footballers
Ghana international footballers
WAFU Nations Cup players
Accra Hearts of Oak S.C. players
FK Donji Srem players
Serbian SuperLiga players
Expatriate footballers in Serbia
Association football midfielders